Rugiluclivina alutacea is a species of ground beetle in the family Carabidae, found in China and Southeast Asia. It was formerly a member of the Clivina genus.

References

Scaritinae
Beetles described in 1896